James Ryan (June 17, 1848 – July 2, 1923) was an Irish-born prelate of the Roman Catholic Church. He served as bishop of the Diocese of Alton in Illinois from 1888 until his death in 1923.

Biography

Early life 
James Ryan was born on June 17, 1848 in Thurles, County Tipperary in Ireland.  When he was age seven, the family immigrated to the United States, settling in Louisville, Kentucky. He studied at St. Thomas' and St. Joseph's Colleges in Bardstown, Kentucky, and at Preston Park Seminary in Louisville.

Priesthood 
Ryan was ordained to the priesthood by Bishop William George McCloskey for what was then the Diocese of Louisville on December 24, 1871. After his ordination, Ryan spent several years afterwards spent a few years as a missionary and teacher

In 1877, when John Lancaster Spalding was appointed to the new Diocese of Peoria in Illinois, Ryan incardinated, or transferred to that diocese. After serving pastoral assignments in Illinois at Wataga and Danville, Ryan was named rector of St. Columba's Parish at Ottawa, Illinois, in 1881.

Bishop of Alton 
On February 28, 1888, Ryan was appointed as the third bishop of the Diocese of Alton by Pope Leo XIII. He received his episcopal consecration on May 1, 1888, from Bishop Spalding, with Bishops McCloskey and John Janssen serving as co-consecrators.

During his 35-year-long tenure, Ryan established 40 new churches and six hospitals, and increased the number of Catholics from 70,000 to over 87,000. He held the first diocesan synod in February 1889. He began raising funds for a new orphanage in 1919 but died before it was completed.

James Ryan died in Alton on June 2, 1923 at age 75.

See also

References

 

1848 births
1923 deaths
People from County Tipperary
20th-century Roman Catholic bishops in the United States
Irish emigrants to the United States (before 1923)
Roman Catholic Diocese of Peoria
Roman Catholic bishops of Alton
Religious leaders from Louisville, Kentucky
Catholics from Kentucky
19th-century Roman Catholic bishops in the United States